Happiness Is Loving Your Teacher is a Canadian short drama film directed by John N. Smith and released in 1977. The film stars Martin Kevan as Mr. Todrick, a wheelchair-using substitute teacher facing an unruly high school class, and Marina Dimakopoulos as Tony, a student and class leader who comes to regret how she treated Mr. Todrick after she is given detention.

Dimakopoulos won the Canadian Film Award for Best Actress in a Non-Feature at the 28th Canadian Film Awards.

References

External links

1977 films
Canadian coming-of-age drama films
National Film Board of Canada short films
Films directed by John N. Smith
Films about teacher–student relationships
Films about educators
Films set in schools
1970s English-language films
Canadian drama short films
1970s Canadian films